is a 12-episode anime series co-produced by A-Real and Project No.9. It aired from April to June 2017. It is based on the PlayStation Vita video game Kenka Banchō Otome, which itself is an otome spinoff of the Kenka Banchō game series. A sequel to the game, Kenka Banchō Otome: 2nd Rumble!! was released on March 14, 2019.

Plot 
Growing up as an orphan, Hinako is shocked to learn that she has an older twin brother called Hikaru. Born as a yakuza, Hikaru requests Hinako to switch places with him at Shishiku Academy, an all-boys school overrun with Japan's toughest delinquents, and become the new yakuza boss.

Cast

Production and development 
Production of the anime was announced in December 2016. The opening theme song is "Love Sniper" and the ending theme song "Gankō Signal" was performed by Love Desire. Crunchyroll streamed the series. Funimation licensed the series and premiered the dub on May 11, 2017.

Episode list

References

External links 
  
 
 

2017 anime television series debuts
Crunchyroll anime
Funimation
Hakusensha manga
Male harem anime and manga
PlayStation Vita games
PlayStation Vita-only games
Project No.9
Shōjo manga
Tokyo MX original programming
Viz Media manga
Yakuza in anime and manga